KNFB Nordstern  was one of the first passenger steam locomotives in the Austrian Empire. It was built by J. and G. Rennie Locomotive Works for the Emperor Ferdinand Northern Railway ( or KFNB) in 1839 and operated from Vienna to Břeclav. Nordstern was the only locomotive of its type supplied to the KFNB and corresponded to standard English designs of the period with a 2-2-2 wheel arrangement in whyte notation. The cylinders were located under the smoke chamber and propelled the cranked second axle.

The table gives values after renovation in 1843. The Nordstern was scrapped in 1865.

References 

 Alfred Horn: Die Kaiser-Ferdinands-Nordbahn, Die Bahnen Österreich-Ungarns, Band 2, Bohmann Verlag, 1970
 Karl Gölsdorf: Lokomotivbau in Alt-Österreich 1837–1918, Verlag Slezak, 1978, 

Steam locomotives of Austria
2-2-2 locomotives
Standard gauge locomotives of Austria
Railway locomotives introduced in 1839